Amanita jacksonii, also known as Jackson's slender amanita,
American Slender Caesar, and Eastern Caesar's Amanita,
is a species of fungus in the family Amanitaceae. It is a reddish-orange colored mushroom species extending from the Province of Quebec, Canada to at least the State of Hidalgo, Mexico. It was given its current name in 1984 by Canadian mycologist René Pomerleau. It can be identified by its yellow gills, large, white, sacklike volva, and bright orange or orange-red cap, which has lined margins.

Description
The cap of the mushroom is 8–12 cm wide; oval at first, becoming convex, typically with a central bump; sticky; brilliant red or orange, fading to yellow on the margin; typically without warts or patches; the margin lined for about 40–50% of the cap's radius. The red pigment fades from margin toward the center with age. Gills are moderately crowded to crowded, orange-yellow to yellow-orange to yellow. They are free from the stem or slightly attached to it; yellow to orange-yellow; crowded; not bruising. The short gills are subtruncate to truncate. Its stipe or stem (90–140 × 9–16 mm) is yellow and is decorated with orange fibrils and patches that are the remnants of a felted extension of the limbus internus of the otherwise white volva. The spores measure (7.0-) 7.8 - 9.8 (-12.1) × (5.2-) 5.8 - 7.5 (-8.7) μm and are broadly ellipsoid to ellipsoid (rarely subglobose or elongate) and inamyloid.  Clamps are common at bases of basidia. The flesh looks whitish to pale yellow, and does not stain on exposure.

The mushroom is considered edible, although it can be misidentified with toxic species such as Amanita muscaria and A. phalloides.
A. jacksonii looks similar to Amanita caesarea, Caesar's mushroom that is found in Europe and North Africa.

See also
List of Amanita species
Amanita caesarea

References

External links

jacksonii
Edible fungi
Fungi of Canada
Fungi of Mexico
Fungi of the United States
Fungi described in 1984
Fungi without expected TNC conservation status